The 2017 Rugby League World Cup Middle East-Africa qualification play-off was a two-match rugby league series, with the winner qualifying for the 2017 Rugby League World Cup. The matches were between South Africa and Lebanon and were played at Brakpan Stadium in Pretoria, South Africa on 25 and 31 October 2015.

Overview 
On 3 October 2014, the 2017 Rugby League World Cup qualifying competition was announced with one qualification spot being granted to the Middle East-Africa region.

Initially a one-off play off match in the Dubai Sports City complex was announced. However the match was cancelled after the head of the Emirates rugby league, Sol Mokdad, was arrested following a complaint from UAE rugby union officials.

South Africa was subsequently given the hosting rights for the qualification fixtures. South Africa RL president Kobus Botha stated that the “SARL is extremely excited about hosting this highly prestigious World Cup Qualifier... We hope that this is the first of many such tournaments and a small glimpse into what South Africa can offer as a potential host country for the 2021 World Cup.”

Squads
Both teams picked preliminary train-on squads with the South Africans picked what they believed was  “a strong, healthy and balanced train-on squad” which contained domestic players as well as eligible South African players based in Australia's reserve grade competitions. The Lebanese selected eligible NRL players along with other reserve grade, domestic and unattached players.

South Africa
The South Africa squad as of 13 October 2015 was as follows:

Coach:  Brian Greige

Lebanon
The Lebanon squad as of 17 October 2015 was as follows:

Coach:  Darren Maroon

First test 

Notes:
Ali Allouche was a late replacement for suspended hooker Jamie Clark.

Second test 

Notes:
 With the win, Lebanon qualified for the 2017 World Cup after a 2–0 series victory.

References 

2015 in rugby league
2017 Rugby League World Cup
2015 in South African sport
2015 in Lebanese sport